"4 Hours" is a song by the English post-punk band Clock DVA. It is the only single released in support of their second album Thirst.

Formats and track listing 
UK 7" single (FET 008)
"4 Hours" (Charlie Collins, Adi Newton, Roger Quail, David Tyme) – 4:00
"Sensorium" (Charlie Collins, Adi Newton, Roger Quail, Steven James Turner, Paul Widger) – 2:48

Accolades 

(*) designates unordered lists.

Personnel
From the 4 Hours sleeve and label notes.

Clock DVA
 Adi Newton – vocals, clarinet, tape, production
 Turner (Steven James Turner) – bass guitar
 Roger Quail – drums
 Paul Widger – guitar
 Charlie Collins – saxophone, flute

Production and additional personnel
 Ken Thomas – engineering, production
 Jonz – mastering
 Neville Brody – sleeve design

Charts

Release history

References

External links 
 

1981 songs
1981 singles
Clock DVA songs